Ursa Major II Dwarf (UMa II dSph) is a dwarf spheroidal galaxy situated in the Ursa Major constellation and discovered in 2006 in the data obtained by the Sloan Digital Sky Survey. The galaxy is located approximately 30 kpc from the Sun and moves towards the Sun with the velocity of about 116 km/s. It has an elliptical (ratio of axes ~ 2:1) shape with the half-light radius of about 140 pc.

Ursa Major II is one of the smallest and faintest satellites of the Milky Way—its integrated luminosity is about 4000 times that of the Sun (absolute visible magnitude of about −4.2), which is much lower than the luminosity of the majority of globular clusters. UMa II is even less luminous than some stars, like Canopus in the Milky Way. It is comparable in luminosity to Bellatrix in Orion. However, its mass is about 5 million solar masses, which means that galaxy's mass to light ratio is around 2000. This may be an overestimate as the galaxy has somewhat irregular shape and may be in process of tidal disruption.

The stellar population of UMa II consists mainly of old stars formed at least 10 billion years ago. The stars of UMa II were probably among the first stars to form in the Universe. Currently there is no star formation in UMa II. The measurements have so far failed to detect any neutral hydrogen in it—the upper limit is only 562 solar masses.

See also
 Ursa Major I Dwarf
 Ursa Minor Dwarf

Notes

References

Dwarf spheroidal galaxies
Ursa Major (constellation)
Local Group
Milky Way Subgroup
?